Otto, Duke of Brunswick-Lüneburg may refer to:

Otto I, Duke of Brunswick-Lüneburg (1204-1252)
Otto the Mild, Duke of Brunswick-Lüneburg (1292-1344)
Otto II, Duke of Brunswick-Lüneburg (1266-1330)
Otto III, Duke of Brunswick-Lüneburg (1296-1352)
Otto IV, Duke of Brunswick-Lüneburg (died 1446)
Otto V, Duke of Brunswick-Lüneburg (1439-1471)